Cecil Howard Palmer (14 July 1873 – 26 July 1915) was an English first-class cricketer who played nine first-class matches around the turn of the 20th century: eight for Hampshire and one for Worcestershire. Unusually, he played for two counties in the same season: his Worcestershire appearance came against Oxford University in 1904, in which year he later played three County Championship matches for Hampshire. In the game against Oxford he made his highest score, 75 not out.

Palmer made his debut for Hampshire against Sussex at Hove in July 1899, scoring 16 and 1. In his other appearance that summer, against Yorkshire at Bradford, he made 64, the first of his two half-centuries. He then did not play again until 1901, when in four innings he totalled just eight runs, and after that there was another gap until the above-mentioned 1904 season. After that year, he was to play just one more game, against Warwickshire at Edgbaston in July 1907.

As a soldier, Palmer was mentioned in despatches in the Second Boer War. In the First World War he was in the 9th Royal Warwickshire Regiment, reaching the rank of lieutenant-colonel. He was killed in action at the Gallipoli campaign, aged 42.

References

External links
 

1873 births
1915 deaths
English cricketers
Hampshire cricketers
Worcestershire cricketers
Royal Warwickshire Fusiliers officers
British Army personnel of World War I
British military personnel killed in World War I
People educated at Radley College